Toshiya Takeuchi (born 24 October 1930) is a Japanese rower. He competed in the men's coxed four event at the 1952 Summer Olympics.

References

1930 births
Living people
Japanese male rowers
Olympic rowers of Japan
Rowers at the 1952 Summer Olympics
Place of birth missing (living people)